Lichtwardtia is a genus of flies in the family Dolichopodidae. It is considered to be a synonym of Dolichopus by Scott E. Brooks (2005), but not by other authors. Before this, it was considered a possible subgenus of Pterostylus by Oleg Negrobov (1979).

It is known from the Afrotropical, Oriental and Australasian realms.

Species

Lichtwardtia aethiopica (Bezzi, 1906)
Lichtwardtia aldabrensis Meuffels & Grootaert, 2007
Lichtwardtia angularis (Macquart, 1842)
Lichtwardtia angulicornis Grichanov, 2004
Lichtwardtia cambodiensis Tang & Grootaert, 2018
Lichtwardtia clypeata Grichanov, 2004
Lichtwardtia conspicabilis Tang & Grootaert, 2018
Lichtwardtia dentalis Zhang, Masunaga & Yang, 2009
Lichtwardtia dianaensis Grichanov, 2019
Lichtwardtia emelyanovi Grichanov, 1998
Lichtwardtia formosana Enderlein, 1912
Lichtwardtia fractinervis (Parent, 1929)
Lichtwardtia ghanaensis Grichanov, 2019
Lichtwardtia hilgerae Grichanov, 2004
Lichtwardtia hirsutiseta (De Meijere, 1916)
Lichtwardtia hollisi Grichanov, 1998
Lichtwardtia infusca Tang & Grootaert, 2018
Lichtwardtia maculata (Parent, 1936)
Lichtwardtia melanesiana (Bickel, 2008)
Lichtwardtia microlepis (Parent, 1939)
Lichtwardtia minuscula (Parent, 1934)
Lichtwardtia mironovi Grichanov, 1998
Lichtwardtia monstruosa Tang & Grootaert, 2018
Lichtwardtia moseikoi Grichanov, 2020
Lichtwardtia musolini Grichanov, 2019
Lichtwardtia nabozhenkoi Grichanov, 2020
Lichtwardtia nigrifacies Grichanov, 2004
Lichtwardtia nigrotorquata (Parent, 1937)
Lichtwardtia nikitai Grichanov, 2019
Lichtwardtia nikolaevae Grichanov, 1998
Lichtwardtia nodulata Grootaert & Tang, 2018
Lichtwardtia oromiaensis Grichanov, 2019
Lichtwardtia polychroma (Loew, 1864)
Lichtwardtia semakau Grootaert & Tang, 2018
Lichtwardtia singaporensis Grootaert & Tang, 2018
Lichtwardtia sukharevae Grichanov, 1998
Lichtwardtia tikhonovi Grichanov, 1998
Lichtwardtia zhangae Tang & Grootaert, 2018

The following species are considered nomina dubia:
Lichtwardtia coxalis Kertész, 1901
Lichtwardtia ziczac (Wiedemann, 1824)

Lichtwardtia taiwanensis Zhang, Masunaga & Yang, 2009 is a synonym of L. formosana Enderlein, 1912.

References

Dolichopodinae
Dolichopodidae genera
Taxa named by Günther Enderlein
Diptera of Africa
Diptera of Asia
Diptera of Australasia